The Rt. Rev.Kenneth George Thompson (died 1975) was a bishop in the Church of England.

Education

Career

From 1940 to 1944 he was a Chaplain to the Royal Naval Volunteer Reserve and Vicar of Kneesal and Ossington in Nottinghamshire. From 1944 to 1965 he was vicar of St Mary Magdelene, Hucknall. From 1954 he was a Canon of Southwell Minster. In 1962 he was appointed Archdeacon of Newark and a Chaplain to Her Majesty the Queen.

In 1965 he was appointed Bishop of Sherwood.

Family

Sources
The Times 4 August 1965

Year of birth missing
1975 deaths
20th-century Church of England bishops
Archdeacons of Newark
Bishops of Sherwood
Alumni of Lincoln Theological College
Royal Naval Volunteer Reserve personnel of World War II
Royal Navy chaplains
World War II chaplains